Daniel Alden Reed (September 15, 1875 – February 19, 1959) was an American football player, coach, and U.S. Representative from the state of New York.   Reed was attorney for the excise department of New York from 1903 to 1909.  He served in the  House of Representatives as a Republican from 1919 until his death in Washington, D.C., on February 19, 1959.

Professional career

Reed was born in Sheridan, New York on September 15, 1875.  He attended the public schools of Sheridan and Silver Creek, New York, and graduated from Cornell University in 1898, where he was a member of the Delta Chi fraternity and the Quill and Dagger society.  Reed studied law, was admitted to the bar in 1900, and practiced first in Silver Creek, and later in Dunkirk, New York.  Reed was also a board of directors member for the Dunkirk Trust Company, and became a popular speech maker on business and civic topics.

He was an attorney for the New York State Excise Department from 1903 to 1909.  During World War I he was one of the commissioners sent to France by the federal government to study the ongoing food shortage in preparation for a U.S. lecture tour on the importance of food conservation.

Coaching career
After playing football at Cornell University, Reed coached at the University of Cincinnati, Pennsylvania State University, and his alma mater. From 1899 to 1900 he coached at Cincinnati, and guided the Bearcats to an 8–6–1 record. He coached at Penn State in 1903, compiling a 5–3 record. From 1910 to 1911, he was the head coach at Cornell, where he led that team to a 12–5–1 record. His career record is 25–14–2.

Head coaching record

Congressional career
In 1918 Reed was elected to Congress as a Republican.  He was reelected 20 times, and served from March 4, 1919 until his death.  During his time in the U.S. House Reed was chairman of the Committee on Industrial Arts and Expositions (Sixty-eighth Congress); the Committee on Education (Sixty-ninth through Seventy-first Congresses); the Committee on Ways and Means (Eighty-third Congress); and the Joint Committee on Internal Revenue Taxation (Eighty-third Congress).

Reed was a delegate to the Interparliamentary Union meeting in Rome, Italy in 1948.  He later served as a delegate at meetings in Sweden, Switzerland, and France.

During his years in Congress, Reed was one of the most conservative members of the New York delegation, frequently scoring zeros from Americans for Democratic Action, and was one of the few isolationists remaining in the New York delegation after World War II.

Reed was also one of the few Republicans to consistently oppose banning the poll tax through legislative means, although he did vote in favor of anti-lynching legislation and the Civil Rights Act of 1957.

Death and burial
Reed died from a major heart attack in Washington, D.C. on February 19, 1959.  He was buried at Sheridan Cemetery in Sheridan, New York.

Legacy
The library at the State University of Fredonia was named for him.

See also

 List of United States Congress members who died in office (1950–99)

References

External links

 
 

1875 births
1959 deaths
19th-century players of American football
American football guards
American athlete-politicians
Cincinnati Bearcats football coaches
Cornell Big Red football coaches
Cornell Big Red football players
Penn State Nittany Lions football coaches
People from Chautauqua County, New York
Players of American football from New York (state)
Old Right (United States)
Republican Party members of the United States House of Representatives from New York (state)
Sportspeople from New York (state)